Jaoli (or Jawali) principality was a Jagir of Maratha Morè (clan) which is located in the  western part of the present day Maharashtra state. Jaoli was seen as a strategically important by Shivaji Maharaj as it is surrounded by dense forest with 13 forts.

History
The state was centered on the valley surrounding Jaoli. In the 1650s, it was ruled by More family, who were vassals of the Adil Shah of the Bijapur Sultanate. The ruler used the name Chandra Rao, who called himself the king of Konkan. He claimed to rule by the divine sanction of the god Mahabaleshwar (an aspect of Shiva), and had been formally recognized as the local Raje (king) by the Adil Shah.

Around 1656, Shivaji Maharaj - another vassal of Adil Shah forcibly captured Jaoli. Shivaji Maharaj, who had similarly captured other territories in the area, justified his action to the Adil Shah, arguing that he governed these territories better than the deposed rulers did. However, the Adil Shah doubted Shivaji Maharaj's loyalty, and sent his general Afzal Khan against Shivaji Maharaj. Shivaji Maharaj defeated Afzal Khan, and went on to establish an independent kingdom that evolved into the Maratha Empire.

See also 
 Maratha Empire
 Jawali, Maharashtra

References

Princely states of Maharashtra
History of Maharashtra